Malachi Murray (born 18 March 2000) is a Canadian sprinter. He has a personal best of 10.19 in the 100 m, and, due to a fifth-place finish in the 100 m at the 2022 Canadian Outdoor Championships, qualified for the Canadian team at the 2022 World Athletics Championships (where he was an alternate for the 4x100 relay) and the 2022 Commonwealth Games, where he did not advance from the 100m heats. He is attached to the Capital City Track Club in Edmonton.

References

2000 births
Living people
Canadian male sprinters
Athletes (track and field) at the 2022 Commonwealth Games